The 1982 season was São Paulo's 53rd season since club's existence.

Statistics

Scorers

Overall

{|class="wikitable"
|-
|Games played ||  83 (18 Campeonato Brasileiro, 9 Torneio dos Campeões,  40 Campeonato Paulista, 6 Copa Libertadores, 10 Friendly match)
|-
|Games won ||  50 (11 Campeonato Brasileiro, 5 Torneio dos Campeões,  23 Campeonato Paulista, 2 Copa Libertadores, 9 Friendly match)
|-
|Games drawn || 14 (1 Campeonato Brasileiro, 2 Torneio dos Campeões,  9 Campeonato Paulista, 2 Copa Libertadores, 0 Friendly match)
|-
|Games lost || 19 (6 Campeonato Brasileiro, 2 Torneio dos Campeões,  8 Campeonato Paulista, 2 Copa Libertadores, 1 Friendly match)
|-
|Goals scored || 135
|-
|Goals conceded || 74
|-
|Goal difference || +61
|-
|Best result || 6–1 (A) v Guarani - Campeonato Paulista - 1982.10.31
|-
|Worst result || 1–3 (A) v Anapolina - Campeonato Brasileiro - 1982.2.281–3 (A) v Palmeiras - Campeonato Paulista - 1982.10.171–3 (A) v Corinthians - Campeonato Paulista - 1982.12.12
|-
|Top scorer || Serginho (34)
|-

Friendlies

Sunshine International Series

Notes

Official competitions

Campeonato Brasileiro

Record

Torneio dos Campeões

Record

Campeonato Paulista

Record

Copa Libertadores

Record

External links
official website 

Association football clubs 1982 season
1982
1982 in Brazilian football